Dioryctria raoi is a species of snout moth in the genus Dioryctria. It was described by Akira Mutuura in 1971 and is known from northern India.

The larvae feed on Pinus roxburghii and other Pinus species. They bore in the shoots of their host plant.

References

Moths described in 1971
raoi